Montserrat Hidalgo (born January 3, 1968 in Calle Blancos, Costa Rica) is a retired female breaststroke swimmer from Costa Rica, who won the bronze medal in the women's 4 × 100 m relay event at the 1987 Pan American Games. She swam for Costa Rica at the 1988 Summer Olympics.

References

1968 births
Living people
Female breaststroke swimmers
Costa Rican female swimmers
Swimmers at the 1987 Pan American Games
Swimmers at the 1988 Summer Olympics
Olympic swimmers of Costa Rica
Pan American Games bronze medalists for Costa Rica
Pan American Games medalists in swimming
Medalists at the 1987 Pan American Games
20th-century Costa Rican women
21st-century Costa Rican women